The Companion of My Rival is a 2008 EP by The New Amsterdams. It was released as a companion to their album At the Foot of My Rival.

Track listing

Personnel
Matt Pryor - Vocals, Guitar
Bill Belzer - Drums
Eric McCann - Upright Bass
Dustin Kinsey - Guitar
Zach Holland - Keyboard
Matthew Doyle - Layout Design
Geoff McCann - Artwork

The New Amsterdams albums
2008 EPs